Ronald "Ron" Lloyd Volmer (born November 22, 1935) is an American water polo player who competed in the 1960 Summer Olympics.  He broke a world swimming record for the 50 yard butterfly and held that record for approximately 15 minutes.

He was born in Downey, California.  Volmer was a water polo players for UC Berkeley while a student there. He obtained a doctor degree in Optometry from Berkley.  He practiced as an optometrist in Manhattan Beach, California. He was married to Judith Hodge (Volmer) and had three children Dana, Brian, and Wendy. 

Volmer was a member of the American water polo team which finished seventh in the 1960 tournament. He played four matches and scored four goals.

In 1990, he was inducted into the USA Water Polo Hall of Fame.

References

External links
 

1935 births
Living people
American male water polo players
California Golden Bears men's water polo players
Olympic water polo players of the United States
Water polo players at the 1960 Summer Olympics
Sportspeople from Downey, California